Super Baseball 2020 is a futuristic baseball video game.  It was first released in Japan for the Neo Geo in 1991, and then it was later released in North America for the Sega Genesis (ported by NuFX and released by Electronic Arts) and Super Nintendo Entertainment System (released by Tradewest) in 1993. The North American Genesis and European Mega Drive versions feature a package illustration by Electronic Arts artist Marc Ericksen.

The game follows the basic rules of baseball, but there are several upgrades since the game takes place in the then future of 2020.  The most obvious difference from real baseball is that some of the characters in this game are robots.  All the human characters are equipped with powerful armor, computer sensors, and jet-packs for improved offense and defensive skills.

Cyber Egg Stadium

Apart from the futuristic characters, the field has also been revamped and redesigned for the future.  There is only one stadium in this game, known as Cyber Egg Stadium.  A ball hit over the outfield fence is no longer a home run unless it is hit directly over the fence in center field.  The other areas of the outfield stands are covered with a protective glass that will cause the ball to bounce off of it and bounce back in play onto the field.  The ball hitting this zone always comes back into the field but gives the batter enough time to take a base or two.  However, slower runners can sometimes be thrown out at first base even if the ball is hit over the outfield fence.

The reason the home run zone was reduced is because the hitters are far more powerful and have the ability to blast the ball tremendously far.  Only the most powerful hitters can have the accuracy and strength to hit the ball far enough to get a home run.  The foul zone has also been reduced.  It is now shorter and only encompasses the area directly behind first base through third base.  Weaker batters can often get a hit by swinging early or late at the ball, causing it to just barely make the fair zone in what would otherwise be the foul zone in normal baseball.

Other features are also present on the field.  A stop zone is present just past the field behind first and third base.  If the ball touches this rectangular spot, it will stop dead.  However, the stop zone is small, and the ball can often bounce right over it without stopping.  It can present a problem for slower runners who were hoping the ball would bounce all the way to the fence.  Near the fence there are jump zones, in which a player gets an extra boost in jump height to catch a ball that is otherwise going to go over the fence.  In the Super NES version, the jump zone is only located in front of the home run zone to try to stop a ball that is going to be a home run.  In other versions, the jump zones are placed all throughout the stadium's fences. In addition, every few innings, "crackers" are put on the field. Crackers are landmines that when are stepped on, sends the player sky high and leaves him shaking on the field for a few seconds, delaying the player's time to make a play. Crackers do not appear in the Super NES version.

Gameplay

Players
Different from real baseball and other baseball video games, this game consists of both male and female characters, as well as robots.  All three types of players have the same basic abilities and vary only on their personal strengths.  In many cases, human players are better than their robot counterparts. One major difference between the human and robot characters is that the robot characters can blow up (or lose all their power) if they are worked too hard during a game. This can happen if the player constantly makes them dive for a ball, run extra bases, or even if they get hit by a pitch. Under no stress whatsoever, some robots, especially pitchers, will naturally run out of power as the game progresses.  When this happens, they will lose all their abilities and be useless, both offensively and defensively. When that occurs, the player can either power them up or replace them with another person on the roster. Human players do not blow up, but human pitchers can tire out. When they are tired, they will pant heavily and throw the ball very slowly. This can be remedied by either an upgrade or, as in real baseball, switching to a relief pitcher.

Powering up
One thing that makes 2020 Super Baseball different from other games is the ability to power-up any character.  During the game, players can earn money doing certain things, ranging from throwing a strike ($100) to hitting a grand slam ($10,000).  Players can earn money both on defense and offense, and the money earned gets saved for use at any time during the game.  Money does not get carried over to the next game, so it is wise to use it all before the game's end.  Money can be deducted during the game, in the event that the player's team gets out.  However, earning money is far easier than losing money.  $10 can be lost for every strike thrown against the player and up to $100 for being put out.

At any point in the game, as long as the player has enough money, it can be spent on upgrading players.  For human players, the player can upgrade three different abilities: hitting, fielding, and pitching.  Upgrading hitting power will allow the player's character to hit the ball farther; fielding power will allow them to run and throw the ball faster when on defense, and pitching upgrades (used only for pitchers) will allow a player to pitch the ball faster and more accurate.  Robots can only be upgraded to more powerful robots, and human players can also be upgraded to robots.  When upgrading to a robot, the character is actually replaced with a more powerful robot that glows with power.

For all four categories of upgrades, there are three different levels of upgrade that can be purchased, known as A, B, and C (C being the most powerful and expensive).  Every category has different prices for their upgrades, and the upgrades offer a higher percentage of power increase.  The most inexpensive upgrade is fielding A (12%) for $1,000, and the most expensive is robot C (80%) for $30,000.  Keep in mind when using the robot upgrade that it powers up all attributes of a character an equal amount corresponding to the upgrade level.  The power received from a non-robot upgrade for a human character adds to the character's already existing powers.  Therefore, if two players, one with a hitting power of two and the other nine, both receive a hitting C upgrade, the latter will still be considerably stronger.

After powering up a player, they retain that upgrade throughout the duration of the game.  However, if that player gets overworked during the game, they may "blow up" and lose their upgrade.  When human players blow up, they return to their normal state before the upgrade.  Conversely, when a robot upgrade blows up, it turns into a dead robot.  A dead robot turns gray and loses all its attributes, giving it a zero in all four categories (hitting, fielding, pitching, and chance).  It can still be used during the game, but it is essentially a worthless player.  After blowing up, an upgraded player can always be re-upgraded as long as there remains adequate money.  When a player is upgraded to A, the player can also spend the money to have them further upgraded to B or C, although this means the full price for the upgrade must be paid (discounts are not offered for those having previously upgraded).  A player cannot be upgraded with the same upgrade they already have until they lose their power.

 In the Super NES version, the amount received is the amount if the base stealing from was taken. Stealing second awards $300 (like a single), stealing third awards $500 (double), stealing home awards $800 (triple).

Limitations
There is no infield fly rule in this game, which can be used to the advantage of a defender if there are base runners.  Double plays and even triple plays are common because of this.
A base runner cannot begin to steal bases until the pitcher has released the ball.  In most baseball video games and in real life, a runner can begin to steal the next base at any time.  However, stealing a base beforehand can only be done if the steal button is continuously pressed right after the screen cuts-back after the batter hit a foul ball, and the pitcher will not even notice the player running.
The third baseman, second baseman, and first baseman will not leave the base to retrieve a ball.  They will instead stand on the base and wait for another fielder to get the ball, which can sometimes mean they will stand there while the ball rolls inches away from them.  The only exception would be if the shortstop covers third or second base for the fielder; then they remain in the stationary position.
Since the game has semi-automatic fielding, the player cannot change which defensive player they want to run after the ball, which means sometimes the pitcher will end up chasing a ball well into the outfield.
If a ball is hit far enough into the stands, it can sometimes become stuck, allowing the batter to garnish an inside-the-park home run.  Because of the reduced home run zone, faster players can often round the bases by hitting the ball up into the fair-zone stands.
The computer players will always attempt to hit the ball straight, as if trying to hit a home run, no matter what the strength of the batter.  This can sometimes give an unfair advantage to the player, since they do not try to pull the ball just barely fair in order to get a hit.  This has its downfall, in that some powerful players will hit home runs easily.
It is not possible to play against a team from the other league except in League mode, where if the player's team wins the pennant, they advance to a one-game championship against the winner of the other league's pennant. In the SNES version the final game is against the secret team The Cosmopolitan Monolis who wear gold and black uniforms and have Nazi related names like V-2, Himmler, Tojoe and Goebbels. 
If more than 100 runs are scored, the player's score will turn back to zero, as there are only two spaces for your runs.  Consequently, if the player scores 101 runs, and their opponent scores two runs, the player will lose the game 01–02.
Players cannot change positions in the field or line up without replacing them.
If another player is in the player's line of path to throw the ball, they will catch the ball after it is thrown.  This means that if the shortstop retrieves a ground ball just behind third base, then the throw will get cut off by the third baseman and then the pitcher before the ball gets to first base.  The pitcher will almost always get in the way, and this can present a problem when trying to pull a double play between third and first or second and home.
If a base runner has touched a base they can not go back to their original base in order not to get forced out.

Reception

RePlay reported Super Baseball 2020 to be the third most-popular arcade game at the time. In Japan, Game Machine listed Super Baseball 2020 on their November 1, 1991 issue as being the ninth most-successful table arcade unit of the month.

On release, Famicom Tsūshin scored the Neo Geo version of the game a 24 out of 40.

In a retrospective review, Allgame editor Kyle Knight described the Neo Geo AES version of Super Baseball 2020 as "a lot of fun to play and a refreshing take on the game of baseball".

Notes

References

External links 
 Super Baseball 2020 at GameFAQs
 Super Baseball 2020 at Giant Bomb
 Super Baseball 2020 at Killer List of Videogames
 Super Baseball 2020 at MobyGames

1991 video games
ACA Neo Geo games
Arcade video games
Baseball video games
D4 Enterprise games
Electronic Arts games
Fantasy sports video games
Multiplayer and single-player video games
Neo Geo games
Neo Geo CD games
Nintendo Switch games
NuFX games
PlayStation Network games
PlayStation 4 games
Sega Genesis games
SNK games
Super Nintendo Entertainment System games
Tradewest games
Video games scored by Brian L. Schmidt
Video games scored by Chris Granner
Video games set in 2020
Virtual Console games
Video games developed in Japan
Xbox One games
Hamster Corporation games